Joseph Roger Bismuth (4 November 1926 – 1 October 2019) was a Tunisian businessman and senator. He was elected into the newly formed upper chamber, the Chamber of Advisors in July 2005 and was the only Jewish elected legislator in the Arab world. Senator Bismuth was also a member of the International Council of Jewish Parliamentarians.

Early life
Bismuth was born in La Goulette (neighborhood of the Port of Tunis) on November 4, 1926. Before a career in politics Bismuth was a businessman. Bismuth began his business career in the construction sector in 1940. Bismuth founded the Groupe Bismuth, a holding company which included businesses involved in distribution, merchandise, chemical production, industry and electrical equipment.

Political career
As Vice-President of the Tunisian Confederation of Industry, Trade and Handicrafts, Bismuth was elected to the Chamber of Advisors on July 3, 2005, becoming the only Jewish parliamentarian in the Arab world at the time. Upon his election, he told the Associated Press: "I am very emotional and proud to have been elected to this parliamentary institution, an illustration of the openness and tolerance that characterize Tunisia". He notably mentioned that he had received congratulations from leaders of the American Jewish Committee as well as the President of the European Jewish Congress.
In March 2012 Bismuth condemned individuals in Tunis who called for the murder of Jews, telling the press he was "no longer optimistic and I can see a clear vision, at the moment, of a future in this country".

Personal life
Bismuth was married twice and had six children. Three children (Jacqueline, Michelle and Philippe) were from his first marriage with his wife Yvette, while three (Stephen, Jean, and Peter) were from his second marriage to Aase, a Danish national.

Bismuth died on October 1, 2019.

Articles 
Jewish Legislators Build International Network
Jewish legislators network, learn, visit ailing Sharon
The International Council of Jewish Parliamentarians (ICJP)
Tunisia looking for ties with Israel

References

Jewish Tunisian politicians
1926 births
2019 deaths
Members of the Chamber of Advisors
Tunisian Jews
Sephardi politicians